The Pingjin campaign, or the Battle of Pingjin, also officially known in Chinese Communist historiography as the Liberation of Beijing and Tianjin was part of the three major campaigns launched by the People's Liberation Army during the late stage of the Chinese Civil War against the Government of the Republic of China. It began on 29 November 1948 and ended on 31 January 1949, lasting a total of 64 days. This campaign marked the end of Nationalist dominance in the North China Plain. The term Pingjin refers to the cities Beiping (now Beijing) and Tianjin.

Background
By the winter of 1948, the balance of power in Northern China was shifting in favor of the People's Liberation Army. As the Communist Fourth Field Army led by Lin Biao and Luo Ronghuan entered the North China Plain after the conclusion of the Liaoshen campaign, Fu Zuoyi and the Nationalist government in Nanjing decided to abandon Chengde, Baoding, Shanhai Pass and Qinhuangdao collectively and withdraw the remaining Nationalist troops to Beiping, Tianjin and Zhangjiakou and consolidate the defense in these garrisons. The Nationalists were hoping to preserve their strength and reinforce Xuzhou where another major campaign was under its way, or alternatively to retreat to the nearby Suiyuan Province if necessary.

Prelude
In preparations for the campaign, the People's Liberation Army halted the advance of First Field Army toward Taiyuan. The attack on Hohhot were also held back as the Third Field Army was being deployed from Jining District toward Beiping.

Campaign

Zhangjiakou

On 29 November 1948, the People's Liberation Army launched an assault on Zhangjiakou. Fu Zuoyi immediately ordered the Nationalist 35th Army in Beiping and the 104th Army in Huailai to reinforce the city. On 2 December, the PLA Second Field Army began to approach Zhuolu. The PLA Fourth Field Army captured Miyun on 5 December and advanced toward Huailai. Meanwhile, the Second Field Army advanced to the south of Zhuolu. As Beiping was at risk of being encircled, Fu recalled both the 35th Army and the 104th Army from Zhangjiakou to return and support the defense of Beiping before being "surrounded and destroyed" by the PLA.

Xinbao'an

On their return from Zhangjiakou, the Nationalist 35th Army found themselves encircled by the Communist forces in Xinbao'an. Nationalist reinforcements from Beiping were intercepted by the Communist forces and were unable to reach the city. As the situation deteriorated, Fu Zuoyi attempted to negotiate secretly with the CCP beginning on 14 December, which was eventually rejected by the CCP on 19 December. The PLA then launched an assault against the city on 21 December and captured the city the next evening. Commander of the 35th Army Guo Jingyun committed suicide as the Communist forces broke into the city, and remaining Nationalist forces were destroyed as they attempted to retreat back to Zhangjiakou.

Tianjin

After capturing both Zhangjiakou and Xinbao'an, the PLA began to amass troops around the Tianjin area beginning on 2 January 1949. Immediately after the conclusion of Huaihai campaign in the south, the PLA launched the final assault on Tianjin on 14 January. After 29 hours of fighting, the Nationalist 62nd Army and 86th Army and a total of 130,000 men in ten divisions were either killed or captured, including the Nationalist commander Chen Changjie. Remainder of the Nationalist troops from the 17th Army Group and the 87th Army that participated in the battle retreated south on 17 January by sea.

Surrender of Beiping
After the fall of Tianjin to the Communist forces, the Nationalist garrison in Beiping was effectively isolated. Fu Zuoyi came to the decision to negotiate a peace settlement on 21 January. In the following week, 260,000 Nationalist troops began to exit the city in anticipation for the immediate surrender. On 31 January, the PLA's Fourth Field Army entered Beiping to take over the city which marked the conclusion of the campaign.

Popular culture 
The Chinese drama, New World (新世界) is set inside besieged Beiping.

References

Sources 

 
 
 
 

Conflicts in 1948
Conflicts in 1949
1948 in China
1949 in China
Campaigns of the Chinese Civil War
Military history of Hebei